Noesis is a philosophical term, referring to the activity of the intellect or nous.

Noesis may also refer to:

Philosophy
 Noesis (phenomenology), technical term in the Brentano–Husserl "philosophy of intentionality" tradition
 Noetics, a branch of metaphysical philosophy concerned with the study of mind and intellect

Music
 Noesis, a 2001–2003 composition by Hanspeter Kyburz
 Noesis, a 2005 concerto by Erkki-Sven Tüür
 "Noesis", a 2005 song by Gackt from Diabolos
 Noesis, American rapper who fronts the group Philadelphia Slick

Other uses
 Noesis (online journal), a search engine and open-access journal for academic philosophy
 Noesis (software), for viewing, converting, and reverse engineering data. 
 Noesis Cultural Society, a Romanian cultural organization
 Thessaloniki Science Center and Technology Museum or NOESIS
 Noesis, the journal of the Mega Society, a high IQ society